Zinc finger protein 669 is a protein that in humans is encoded by the ZNF669 gene.

References

Further reading 

Human proteins